Aciagrion steeleae is a species of damselfly in the family Coenagrionidae. It is found in Angola, Botswana, Malawi, Zambia, and possibly Tanzania. Its natural habitats are subtropical or tropical moist lowland forests, dry savanna, moist savanna, subtropical or tropical dry shrubland, rivers, intermittent rivers, swamps, freshwater marshes, and intermittent freshwater marshes.

References

 

Coenagrionidae
Insects described in 1955
Taxonomy articles created by Polbot